Byalgan is a medieval aul in Dzheyrakhsky District of Ingushetia. It is part of the rural settlement of Olgeti (administrative center rural settlement).

Geography 
The village is located in the southern part of Ingushetia at a distance of about 9 kilometers in a straight line to the south-east from the regional center of Dzheyrakh.

Archaeology 

The battle tower of Byalgan is one of the oldest in mountainous Ingushetia. As a result of a radiocarbon study, scientists date the tower to 1298–1440. Radiocarbon dating was carried out in the US at the Center for Applied Radioisotope Research at the Georgia State University. For the tower, two samples were dated, taken from one core (No. D42A-10), obtained from a wooden element of the tower structure - the horizontal beam-lintel of the 3rd floor window. The beam is made of linden. The gap between two samples is 86 growth rings.

References

External links 
 Открытый Кавказ
 Byalgan: 3D virtual tour

Rural localities in Ingushetia
History of Ingushetia